Joseph Mark Garrett (born 13 December 1990), better known as Stampylonghead, Stampylongnose, or simply Stampy, is an English YouTuber, gamer, author, and filmmaker known for his video game commentaries including Minecraft, and for playing the character of Stampy Cat. He is well-known for his child-friendly demeanor and incorporation of storytelling and education into the Let's Play format. In 2014, he was one of the ten most watched channels in the world, and has been called "the Mister Rogers of Minecraft" by Entertainment Weekly.

In 2015, Garrett created a edutainment series called Wonder Quest in collaboration with Maker Studios and Disney. The show is designed and filmed in Minecraft, and features educational content designed for children and schools. It aired two seasons from 2015 to 2016. He also voiced himself in the video game Minecraft: Story Mode, and has guest appeared on several television programs with CBBC and Disney XD. He has also released two children's books.

As of January 2023, Garrett's channel has gained over 8 billion video views and over 10.6 million subscribers.

Life and career

Garrett was born in Portsmouth, United Kingdom on 13 December 1990. He studied TV and video production at university and initially intended to be a game journalist.

In August 2006, Garrett created his first YouTube channel, stampylongnose. Initially, his channel consisted of live-action comedy skits and animations he made with his friends, but he soon transitioned to gaming after Let's Play videos began to surge in popularity on YouTube. He mainly played first-person shooter video games such as Halo and Homefront. Soon after, he began his current main channel, stampylonghead. He was introduced to the game Minecraft in May 2012, and would begin his longest-running series, Stampy's Lovely World, with over 700 episodes as of February 2023. The series resulted in rapid growth for his channel and he quickly became a prominent member of YouTube. When he noticed that his primary audience were children, he reoriented his work to be family-friendly. When his videos became popular, Garrett left his job as a barman to focus on producing content full-time.

His avatar is a character called Stampy Cat, an orange and white cat. Garrett's Minecraft series adds story elements to an otherwise non-story game, while he builds his world and giving viewers ideas for activities to pursue with their friends. Garrett describes the character as "a bigger, brighter, better version" of himself. Other characters in the videos (who are referred to as Stampy's "helpers") include iBallisticSquid, the YouTube name of Garrett's friend David Spencer, and Sqaishey Quack, a duck character played by Garrett's spouse, Kye Bates; they became engaged in 2018 and were married the following year. Jordan Shapiro said that "he does a great job of bringing the positive aspects of Minecraft—the game’s educational potential—to the surface." Caroline Knorr of Common Sense Media describes Stampy's presentation as best for younger fans and that "Stampy feels like a cross between Pee-Wee Herman and Mr. Rogers."

On 25 April 2015, Garrett launched a spin-off edutainment YouTube series in collaboration with Maker Studios. The series, Wonder Quest, is scripted, professionally produced, and designed so that it can be used in classrooms. In July 2015, he appeared on the series premiere of the Disney XD sitcom Gamer's Guide to Pretty Much Everything, where he portrayed the announcer Stampy Cat at the World Gaming Championships. He was a featured panelist at MineCon in July 2015, held in London.

Garrett has signed a two-book deal with Egmont Publishing. Stampy's Lovely Book was released on 22 October 2015; aimed at ages 4 to 10, it features games, activities, jokes and facts about Stampy Cat and some of his friends. Stampy Cat: Stick with Stampy! was released on 28 July 2016; the 32 paged paperback features sticker-based activities, games, jokes and posters.

Bibliography 

 Stampy's Lovely Book (Egmont, 2015), 
 Stampy Cat: Stick with Stampy! (Egmont, 2016),

Filmography

Awards and nominations

References

External links
 

English YouTubers
Living people
English male video game actors
English male voice actors
Mass media people from Portsmouth
Gaming YouTubers
Let's Players
1990 births
Minecraft YouTubers